Morass may refer to:

Marsh, a wetland
Morass (set theory), an infinite combinatorial structure
The Morass, former name of Inundation, Gibraltar
Palais Morass, a historic building in Heidelberg, Germany, which houses the Kurpfälzisches Museum
Morass (film), a 1922 German silent film